Clifton Earl Johnson (9 December 1941 – 25 June 2009), born in Williamston, NC, Martin County,  was an American jurist who served on the North Carolina Court of Appeals from 1982 through 1996.

Johnson, who graduated from North Carolina Central University and its law school, was the first African-American to serve as a North Carolina District Court judge and the first to serve as chief judge of a district (in Mecklenburg County). In 1978, he became the first African-American elected superior court judge in the state since Reconstruction. Gov. Jim Hunt appointed Johnson to the Court of Appeals in 1982. He was elected statewide later that year and re-elected in 1990. Johnson retired in 1996 as the court's senior associate judge. He later served as a special emergency superior court judge until his sudden death at a conference of judges in 2009.

See also
 List of African-American jurists
 List of first minority male lawyers and judges in New York

References
Charlotte Observer: Judicial trailblazer from Charlotte dies
Obituary - The Charlotte Post
Obituary - Q City Metro
Quiet revolution in the South By Chandler Davidson, Bernard Grofman

1941 births
2009 deaths
African-American judges
North Carolina Court of Appeals judges
North Carolina Central University alumni
20th-century American judges
20th-century African-American people
21st-century African-American people